Chashma (formerly: Kuchkan) is a village in western Tajikistan. It is part of the jamoat Jura Rahmonov in the city of Tursunzoda.

References

Populated places in Districts of Republican Subordination